Ostrinotes is a Neotropical genus of butterflies in the family Lycaenidae.

Species
Ostrinotes purpuriticus (H. Druce, 1907) cryptic hairstreak – southeast Mexico to Colombia
Ostrinotes empusa (Hewitson, 1867) Empusa hairstreak – Panama to Argentina 
Ostrinotes halciones (A. Butler & H. Druce, 1872) halciones hairstreak – Mexico to Brazil 
Ostrinotes tympania (Hewitson, 1869) Brazil
Ostrinotes tarena (Hewitson, 1874) French Guiana 
Ostrinotes gentiana (H. Druce, 1907) Colombia 
Ostrinotes sospes (Draudt, 1920) Colombia 
Ostrinotes keila (Hewitson, 1869) Keila hairstreak – Mexico to Colombia 
Ostrinotes sophocles (Fabricius, 1793) "Indiis" and Brazil

References

Eumaeini
Lycaenidae of South America
Lycaenidae genera